Mokati, or Wanambre after one of the villages in which it is spoken, is a Papuan language of Sumgilbar Rural LLG, Madang Province, Papua New Guinea.

There are two main dialects. One is spoken in Wanambre and Mawet villages, while another one is spoken in Tinami and Kotakot villages. Differences in vocabulary include Wanambre wena 'louse' Tinami nokalol 
'louse'.

References

Tiboran languages
Languages of Madang Province